Vexillum verecundulum is a species of small sea snail, marine gastropod mollusk in the family Costellariidae, the ribbed miters.

Description
The length of the shell attains 10 mm.

Distribution
This marine species occurs off Lifou, Loyalty Islands.

References

External links
 Hervier, J. "Descriptions d'especes nouvelles de mollusques, provenant de l'Archipel de la Nouvelle-Caledonie (suite)." Journ. de Conchyl. 46 (1897): 3a.

verecundulum
Gastropods described in 1897